
Gmina Sędziszów Małopolski is an urban-rural gmina (administrative district) in Ropczyce-Sędziszów County, Subcarpathian Voivodeship, in south-eastern Poland.

Villages
Apart from the town of Sędziszów Małopolski, Gmina Sędziszów Małopolski contains the villages and settlements of Będziemyśl, Boreczek, Borek Wielki, Cierpisz, Czarna Sędziszowska, Góra Ropczycka, Kawęczyn Sędziszowski, Klęczany, Krzywa, Ruda, Szkodna, Wolica Ługowa, Wolica Piaskowa and Zagorzyce.

Neighbouring gminas
Gmina Sędziszów Małopolski is bordered by the gminas of Iwierzyce, Kolbuszowa, Niwiska, Ostrów, Ropczyce, Świlcza and Wielopole Skrzyńskie.

References
Polish official population figures 2006

Sedziszow Malopolski
Ropczyce-Sędziszów County